Parramore Island Natural Area Preserve is a  Natural Area Preserve located in Accomack County, Virginia, United States. Located on one of the barrier islands along the Atlantic Ocean, it is the state's largest Natural Area Preserve.

The preserve is owned by The Nature Conservancy as part of their Virginia Coast Reserve, which includes 13 additional uninhabited barrier islands. Although it is not typically open to the public, access for research or educational purposes may be obtained from The Nature Conservancy.

See also
 List of Virginia Natural Area Preserves

References

External links
Virginia Department of Conservation and Recreation: Parramore Island Natural Area Preserve
The UncommonWealth: Voices from the Library of Virginia: "Beachhead Revisited: Parramore’s Island On The Eastern Shore" by Louise Jones

Virginia Natural Area Preserves
Protected areas of Accomack County, Virginia